KMND (1510 AM), branded as "Fox Sports 1510 KMND", is a radio station that serves the Midland–Odessa metropolitan area with Fox Sports Radio talk shows, the WinningEDGE radio show, and a weekly sports update on Pro Football and Basketball.  It also simulcasts the programming on 99.5 FM. 1510 AM is under ownership of Townsquare Media. 99.5 FM is owned by Eastern New Mexico University under a LMA to Townsquare Media.

Its studios are located on Highway 191 just west of Midland (its city of license) in rural Midland County and its transmitter is located south of Midland.

1510 AM is a United States clear-channel frequency; KMND must leave the air during the period from sunset to sunrise in order the protect the nighttime skywave signal of WLAC in Nashville, Tennessee.

1510 AM signed on in Midland in 1958. It began as a 500 watt daytimer called KABH. Over its early years it was a middle of road station. In the late 1960's and early 1970's it diversified to Pop and Rock Music up until about 5 PM then "Rogelio" would sign on for a few hours with Spanish language and Spanish music broadcasting then "Rick V" or "John M" would take over the mic playing a variety of Hard Rock up until sundown.  In this time frame the station also promoted a local concert in the early 1970's with the rock band "Josefus" playing.  I believe it was held around the old fairgrounds area off I-20 in the east end of town.

Early Partners in cross town KNFM acquired an interest in KABH and the letters were changed to KNAM. About 1979 the station changed owners, relocated its office, and changed calls to KMND for "Command".

As an affiliate of the Dallas Cowboys, KMND carried the Wade Phillips show and the Dallas Cowboys daily report, but they did not have the contract to air the games. Sister station KGEE/KNFM aired the Cowboys games in the Odessa-Midland area. As an affiliate of ESPN Radio, the station carried commercials for the ESPN Radio College Football Game of the Week, the BCS on ESPN Radio, the NIT on ESPN Radio, and Major League Baseball on ESPN Radio, but the station only aired college bowl games that were sold as part of ESPN Radio coverage nationwide. In 2009 they ended up adding the full broadcast schedule beginning with the NBA on ESPN Radio and then continuing into Major League Baseball on ESPN Radio. They also carried live coverage of the  Midland High Bulldogs and the  Midland Lee Rebels post-season play for all sports except football. The station doesn't produce any local shows, but in the past they produced Sportstalk with Robbie Burns which aired weekdays from 3 PM- 6 PM and Saturday from 10 AM- 12 PM. They also aired coverage of post-season sports for the Midland College Chaparalls from 2004–2008. In 2009 those rights moved to KQRX.

Before becoming an ESPN Radio affiliate, KMND specialized in talk radio shows now found on KCRS (AM), including Rush Limbaugh, and tejano music.

In March 2017 KMND moved from ESPN Radio to Fox Sports Radio.

Local shows the station previously produced
SportsTalk With Robbie Burns

Live sports KMND has broadcast
Cotton Bowl Classic (1998–2002)
Sun Bowl (1998–2002)
NFL on Westwood One (1998–2002)
Texas Longhorns football (1998–2006)
TCU Horned Frogs football (1998–2006)
Texas Tech Lady Raider Basketball (1998–2006)
Motor Racing Network (1998–2006)
2007 New Mexico Bowl
2007 Hawaii Bowl
2007 Chick-fil-A Bowl
2008 Outback Bowl
2008 Hawaii Bowl
2008 Chick-fil-A Bowl
2009 Hawaii Bowl
2009 Outback Bowl
2009 Rose Bowl
2009 Liberty Bowl
(after the All-Star Break) 2009 NBA on ESPN Radio
2009 World Baseball Classic Semi-finals and Championship game
2009 Major League Baseball on ESPN Radio night games
2010 Major League Baseball on ESPN Radio night games

References

External links

MND
ESPN Radio stations
Radio stations established in 1958
MND
1958 establishments in Texas